Derrahs Branch is a stream in Lewis County in the U.S. state of Missouri.

Derrahs Branch has the name of the local Derrah family.

See also
List of rivers of Missouri

References

Rivers of Lewis County, Missouri
Rivers of Missouri